Lower Chattahoochee Regional Airport  is a county-owned, public-use airport located four nautical miles (5 mi, 7 km) southwest of the central business district of Cuthbert, a city in Randolph County, Georgia, United States. It was formerly known as Cuthbert-Randolph Airport. This airport is included in the National Plan of Integrated Airport Systems for 2011–2015, which categorized it as a general aviation facility.

Facilities and aircraft 
Lower Chattahoochee Regional Airport covers an area of 46 acres (19 ha) at an elevation of 457 feet (139 m) above mean sea level. It has one runway designated 18/36 with an asphalt surface measuring 3,000 by 60 feet (914 x 18 m). For the 12-month period ending June 23, 2010, the airport had 2,000 general aviation aircraft operations, an average of 38 per week.

References

External links 
 Aerial image as of February 1999 from USGS The National Map
 

Airports in Georgia (U.S. state)
Transportation in Randolph County, Georgia